Ketul Patel (born 26 February 1988) is an Indian first-class cricketer who plays for Baroda.

References

External links
 

1988 births
Living people
Indian cricketers
Baroda cricketers
People from Vadodara